Novy Oskol is a town and the administrative center of Novooskolsky District in Belgorod Oblast, Russia,  northeast of Belgorod, the administrative center of the oblast. Population:  It is called Novy Oskol (New Oskol) to distinguish it from Stary Oskol (Old Oskol) 60 km north. Both are on the south-flowing Oskol River.

History
It was near the Muravsky Trail used by Crimeans and Nogais to raid Muscovy. In 1637 it was founded as a fort. In 1647 it became a city with the name Tsaryov-Alekseev after Tsar Alexis of Russia. In 1655 it was named Novy Oskol to distinguish it from Stary Oskol (Old Oskol) to the north.

Administrative and municipal status
Within the framework of administrative divisions, Novy Oskol serves as the administrative center of Novooskolsky District, to which it is directly subordinated. As a municipal division, the town of Novy Oskol, together with the settlement of Rudny in Novooskolsky District, is incorporated within Novooskolsky Municipal District as Novy Oskol Urban Settlement.

References

Notes

Sources

External links
Unofficial website of Novy Oskol 
Another unofficial website of Novy Oskol 

Cities and towns in Belgorod Oblast
Populated places in Novooskolsky District
Novooskolsky Uyezd